The Scarecrow is a 2009 novel written by American author Michael Connelly.  It was Connelly's 21st book (20th novel) and the second featuring as the main character Jack McEvoy, a reporter now living in Los Angeles, and FBI agent Rachel Walling.  As a result, the novel is a sequel to the events in Connelly's 1996 book The Poet, although another Connelly novel, The Narrows, was published in 2004 as the "official" sequel to The Poet.   The book was published in the UK and Ireland on May 12, 2009, and in the US and Canada on May 26, 2009.

Although McEvoy has made two subsequent appearances in Connelly's Harry Bosch novels (A Darkness More Than Night and The Brass Verdict), and Walling has appeared in three such novels (The Narrows, Echo Park and The Overlook), this was their first appearance together since The Poet.

Plot
The story begins with Jack McEvoy's termination by the Los Angeles Times due to the newspaper's financial crisis.  He is given two weeks to train his replacement, Angela Cook, on the "cop beat" and decides that he wants to write one more major story before his last day.  Jack focuses on the case of 16-year-old drug dealer Alonzo Winslow, who the police have got a confession from. A stripper was found brutally raped, stuffed in the trunk of a car in Santa Monica with a plastic bag over her head, tied shut with a length of rope around her neck.  Angela, a beautiful and ambitious young reporter, maneuvers to get herself a part of the story.  However, after Jack is given access to the defense files, he learns that Alonzo only confessed to stealing the car containing the body, not to the rape-murder.  In researching trunk murders on the Internet, Angela unwittingly finds evidence of a similar crime in Las Vegas.  However, Angela's research also took her to a "trap" site set up by the real murderer: Wesley Carver, an MIT graduate who is the chief security officer of a "server farm" (colocation and backup services) near Phoenix, referred to by everyone as the "scarecrow" of the farm.  Carver cracks her e-mail password at the Times and learns that Jack is headed to Vegas.  He promptly creates a fake data emergency so that his company will send him to L.A.

The next day,  Jack finds that none of his credit cards nor his cell phone work, so he buys a throwaway phone.  He shows the evidence of the identical L.A. murder to the attorney for the convicted Vegas murderer, who gives Jack a letter permitting him to meet his client, imprisoned in a remote location in Nevada.  During the lengthy drive on the "loneliest road in America", Jack calls FBI agent Rachel Walling, his former girlfriend to whom he hasn't spoken in years, to report the "under the radar" serial killer and also tells her about his bad luck that day.  When he arrives at the prison, he is told that he cannot see the prisoner until the next day and books a room in a local hotel.  A cowboy with long sideburns plays slots next to him.  When Jack heads to his room, he sees "Sideburns" coming directly toward him in the hallway as his door opens ... to find Rachel inside his room.  "Sideburns" passes by.  Rachel had taken a private FBI plane to the prison after she concluded that Jack's discoveries and his electronic problems were linked but that she had no way to warn him.  Rachel and Jack learn that "Sideburns" was not staying at the hotel and surmise that he must be the killer.  When calling the Times, Jack learns that Angela has disappeared.  Rachel and Jack promptly take the FBI jet back to L.A. During the flight, Rachel examines the evidence and notes that the murdered women were both exotic dancers with similar body types ("giraffes"), and that both were put in leg braces ("iron maidens") while being sexually abused before death, a perversion known as abasiophilia.  On arrival, Rachel admits that her recent relationship with a police detective ended in part because she still had feelings for Jack, but they then find Angela's dead body under Jack's bed, killed in the same style as the other victims.

Because of Rachel's testimony, Jack is cleared of Angela's murder, and the evidence causes both Alonzo and the Vegas convict to be freed.  The FBI links the trap site to Bill Denslow, a fake name used by an online client of Carver's server farm.  Jack is a featured guest on CNN to discuss the case, but Rachel is summoned to a disciplinary hearing and forced to resign from the FBI under threat of a theft prosecution for "stealing" the gasoline in the FBI plane during the round trip to Nevada.  Carver has his assistant, whom he gave the pseudonym "Freddie Stone", help him murder and bury the server farm's CEO and then quit.  Jack deduces that the serial killer knew non-public legal information about his victims and finds that all of them were represented by law firms whose sites were handled through Carver's server farm, just like the trap site.  He persuades Rachel to join him there, where they pose as potential clients and talk to Carver, who doesn't reveal that he knows their real identities.  Following a trail laid by Carver, they find Stone's house, identify him as "Sideburns", and uncover evidence concerning the killings.  They call in the FBI, and Rachel is able to use her role in finding the killer to regain her job.  Jack agrees to return to L.A. and goes to Rachel's hotel room to say goodbye—but finds that she has just been kidnapped by Stone.  He intercepts Stone, rescues an unconscious Rachel from a laundry bin, and then chases and kills Stone in a battle on the top floor.  Rachel tells Jack that the FBI believes there were two killers: Stone and Angela's murderer.  With Carver's help, Rachel and the FBI team find evidence that Stone and the missing CEO committed all of the murders.

Jack's high profile causes the Times to rescind his termination, even though Jack's role as a participant means that he cannot write the story of the Arizona events.  Jack turns it down and accepts a two-book deal to write about this case.  However, Jack then sees a picture from The Wizard of Oz in his editor's office and realizes that the method used to suffocate the victims looks like the classic head of a scarecrow, except using a plastic bag instead of a burlap sack.  He immediately heads to Arizona to warn a disbelieving Rachel, including the links to the real Fred Stone and Bill Denslow, but unfortunately meets her in a coffee shop near the server farm with a full-time Webcam in it.  Jack deduces that they are being watched by 'The Scarecrow' over the webcam. Carver watches their discussion, then ambushes the other FBI agents.  Carver's plan to kill the agents and fake his own death is foiled when Jack figures it out, and Rachel shoots Carver in the head when he tries to ambush them, leaving Carver in a seemingly permanent comatose state.  In a brief epilogue, Jack's research has revealed that Carver's mother was an exotic dancer similar in appearance to the victims who needed to wear leg braces when not performing.

The story closes with Carver in medical lockdown, deep in a coma, alone with his thoughts.

Related material
Connelly wrote and produced a pre-release video for the novel and a series of three videos entitled "Conflict of Interest", directed by Terrill Lankford, presenting a connection between Rachel Walling and the events of this story prior to the start of the book.  The videos have been posted on YouTube:
 The Scarecrow
 Conflict of Interest, Chapter One
 Conflict of Interest, Chapter Two
 Conflict of Interest, Chapter Three

Footnotes

2009 American novels
English-language books
Novels about journalists
Novels by Michael Connelly
Novels set in Los Angeles
Little, Brown and Company books